Vildan Pelin Karahan Güntay (born 6 October 1984) is a Turkish actress and TV host, best known for her portrayal of Mihrimah Sultan, Sultan Süleyman's only daughter in Muhteşem Yüzyıl and in Kavak Yelleri (Turkish remake of Dawson's Creek).

Early life
Karahan was born in Ankara, Turkey, to Bayram Ali Karahan and Nural Koçyiğit. Her maternal grandmother is an Albanian immigrant.

Karahan attended Arı College Elementary School, and completed middle school partly at Ankara Gaziosmanpaşa Primary School, partly at Ödemiş Primary School. She graduated from the Lyceum of Sokollu Mehmet Paşa and then from the School of Tourism Enterprises at Anadolu University.

Career
At the start of her career, Karahan featured in Coca-Cola Light and Carrefour advertisements.

She played the role of Aslı Zeybek in the teen drama television series, Kavak Yelleri (Turkish remake of Dawson's Creek), broadcast on Turkish TV channel Kanal D from 2007 to 2011.

In 2012, she was signed up to appear in the popular TV series Muhteşem Yüzyıl ("Magnificent Century"), as Mihrimah Sultan which is about the life of Sultan Suleiman the Magnificent. In 2021, she played historical series "Bir Zamanlar Kıbrıs" about Turks in Cyprus.

Also, she performs in play "Şaşırt Beni" which written by "Selçuk Aydemir", famous writer. She performs in musical theatre "Broadway'den İstanbul'a Müzikaller".

She is the host of Bir Evde animal program and Nefis Tarifler cooking programming.

Personal life
Pelin was married to fitness instructor Erdinç Bekiroğlu from 2011 until 2013. On 24 June 2014, she married Bedri Güntay. She gave birth to their son, Ali Demir, in December 2014. A second son named Can Eyüp was born in March 2017.

Filmography

Television

Awards

References

External links
 
 Pelin Karahan on TurkishStarsDaily.com

1984 births
Living people
People from Ankara
Turkish film actresses
Turkish people of Albanian descent
Anadolu University alumni